Piñataland is a Brooklyn-based musical group created by David Wechsler and Doug Stone. Their songs are often about obscure historical events and people, including:

The pygmy Ota Benga ("Ota Benga's Name")
The painter John Banvard ("The Ballad of John Banvard")
The daredevil Sam Patch ("The Fall of Sam Patch")
The elephant Topsy ("Coney Island Funeral")
The spiritualist John Murray Spear ("Dream of the New Mary")
The journalist William Cobbett's efforts to rebury Thomas Paine ("American Man")
Edward Leedskalnin's Coral Castle ("Latvian Bride")
The Inuit Minik Wallace ("If Ice Were Warm")

Pinataland have often performed at historical sites such as the Old Stone House (Brooklyn), the Cobble Hill Tunnel, and Green-Wood Cemetery. They have also covered historical tunes, such as President John Quincy Adams' campaign song "Little Know Ye Who's Comin'".

Discography
Piñataland - EP (1997)
Songs from Konijn Kok - EP (1999)
Songs for the Forgotten Future Volume 1 (2003)
Songs for the Forgotten Future Volume 2 (2008)
Hymns for the Dreadful Night (2011)

References

External links
 
  [ Pinataland on Allmusic]
 Pinataland: Musical History, National Public Radio 
 Pinataland article in New York Observer
  Pinataland: Best dark old-weird-history orchestrette, Pinataland in Village Voice's Best of 2004

Alternative rock groups from New York (state)
Musical groups established in 1998